Events in the year 1994 in Japan. It corresponds to Heisei 6 (平成6年) in the Japanese calendar.

Incumbents
 Emperor: Akihito
 Prime Minister: Morihiro Hosokawa (JNP–Kumamoto) to April 28 Tsutomu Hata (JRP–Nagano) to June 30 Tomiichi Murayama (S–Ōita)
 Chief Cabinet Secretary: Masayoshi Takemura (NPH–Shiga) to April 28 Hiroshi Kumagai (JRP–Shizuoka) to June 30 Kōzō Igarashi (S–Hokkaidō)
 Chief Justice of the Supreme Court: Ryōhachi Kusaba
 President of the House of Representatives: Takako Doi (S–Hyōgo)
 President of the House of Councillors: Bunbē Hara (L–Tokyo)
 Diet sessions: 129th (regular, January 31 to June 29) 130th (extraordinary, July 18 to July 22) 131st (extraordinary, September 30 to December 9)

Governors
Aichi Prefecture: Reiji Suzuki 
Akita Prefecture: Kikuji Sasaki 
Aomori Prefecture: Masaya Kitamura 
Chiba Prefecture: Takeshi Numata 
Ehime Prefecture: Sadayuki Iga 
Fukui Prefecture: Yukio Kurita
Fukuoka Prefecture: Hachiji Okuda 
Fukushima Prefecture: Eisaku Satō
Gifu Prefecture: Taku Kajiwara 
Gunma Prefecture: Hiroyuki Kodera 
Hiroshima Prefecture: Yūzan Fujita 
Hokkaido: Takahiro Yokomichi 
Hyogo Prefecture: Toshitami Kaihara 
Ibaraki Prefecture: Masaru Hashimoto 
Ishikawa Prefecture: Yōichi Nakanishi (until 29 March); Masanori Tanimoto (starting 29 March)
Iwate Prefecture: Iwao Kudō 
Kagawa Prefecture: Jōichi Hirai 
Kagoshima Prefecture: Yoshiteru Tsuchiya 
Kanagawa Prefecture: Kazuji Nagasu 
Kochi Prefecture: Daijiro Hashimoto 
Kumamoto Prefecture: Joji Fukushima 
Kyoto Prefecture: Teiichi Aramaki 
Mie Prefecture: Ryōzō Tagawa 
Miyagi Prefecture: Shirō Asano 
Miyazaki Prefecture: Suketaka Matsukata 
Nagano Prefecture: Gorō Yoshimura 
Nagasaki Prefecture: Isamu Takada 
Nara Prefecture: Yoshiya Kakimoto
Niigata Prefecture: Ikuo Hirayama 
Oita Prefecture: Morihiko Hiramatsu 
Okayama Prefecture: Shiro Nagano 
Okinawa Prefecture: Masahide Ōta
Osaka Prefecture: Kazuo Nakagawa 
Saga Prefecture: Isamu Imoto 
Saitama Prefecture: Yoshihiko Tsuchiya
Shiga Prefecture: Minoru Inaba 
Shiname Prefecture: Nobuyoshi Sumita 
Shizuoka Prefecture: Yoshinobu Ishikawa 
Tochigi Prefecture: Fumio Watanabe
Tokushima Prefecture: Toshio Endo 
Tokyo: Shun'ichi Suzuki 
Tottori Prefecture: Yuji Nishio 
Toyama Prefecture: Yutaka Nakaoki
Wakayama Prefecture: Shirō Kariya  
Yamagata Prefecture: Kazuo Takahashi 
Yamaguchi Prefecture: Toru Hirai 
Yamanashi Prefecture: Ken Amano

Events
 April 25 – The Shinjuku Park Tower, designed by Kenzo Tange and featured in the film Lost in Translation, is completed.
 April 26 – China Airlines Flight 140, an Airbus A300, crashes while landing at Nagoya Airfield, killing 264 people. It is the second deadliest aviation incident in Japan, as well as the third deadliest involving an Airbus A300.
 June to October – A heatwave hit and water shortage around Japan, according to Japan Weathfare and Ministry official announced, total 579 person death by heat-stroke in Japan.
 June 28 – Members of the Aum Shinrikyo cult execute the first sarin gas attack at Matsumoto, Japan, killing 8 and injuring 200.
August – The office of the Prime Minister establishes a website.
August 2 – While riding a moped, Takeshi Kitano is involved in a collision with a car in Shinjuku and is seriously injured. 
 August 5 – A bank 541 million-yen robbery incident in Kobe, according to National Police Agency of Japan confirmed report, there are no arrest on suspicion in incident.
 September 4 – Kansai International Airport in Osaka, Japan opens. All international services are transferred from Itami to Kansai.
 October 2–October 16 – The Asian Games are held in Hiroshima.
 October 13 – Kenzaburō Ōe receives the Nobel Prize in Literature.
 December 28; At least three people die after a 7.5 magnitude earthquake struck off the coast of Aomori and Iwate prefectures.

Births

 January 13 – Yuma Nakayama, actor and singer
 January 29 – Ayane Sakura, voice actress
 February 5 – Saki Nakajima, singer
 February 24 – Kōta Nakagawa, professional baseball pitcher 
 February 27 – Rie Takahashi, voice actress
 March 6 – Miwako Kakei, actress
 March 10 – Mariya Nagao, actress
 March 13 – Kento Nakajima, singer and actor
 March 26 – Mayu Watanabe, singer
 March 30 – Haruka Shimazaki, actress and singer
 April 4 – Risako Sugaya, singer
 April 12 – Airi Suzuki, pop singer, actress and model
 May 24:  Daiya Seto, swimmer
 August 8: Kazuki Tanaka, professional baseball player
 August 18: Seiya Suzuki, professional baseball player
 April 25 – Hirona Yamazaki, actress
 June 15 – Rina Hidaka, voice actress
 June 21 – Chisato Okai, singer
 July 5 – Shohei Ohtani, baseball player  
 August 1 – Ayaka Wada,
 August 4 – Mayuko Fukuda, Japanese actress  
 August 16 – Riho Takada, actress and model
 August 17 – Tasuku Hatanaka, actor and voice actor
 September 1 – Haruka Miyashita, volleyball player
 September 7 – Kento Yamazaki, actor and model
 September 21 – Fumi Nikaidō, actress and fashion model
 October 13 – Yuta Watanabe, basketball player
 October 30 – Miyū Tsuzurahara, voice actress and child actress
 November 7 – Haruna Iikubo, singer
 November 9 – Kōji Chikamoto, professional baseball player
 November 10 – Takuma Asano, footballer
 December 7 – Yuzuru Hanyu, figure skater
 December 29 – Princess Kako of Akishino, Princess and daughter of Prince Akishino  and Princess Akishino

Deaths
 May 4 – Koto Matsudaira, diplomat (b. 1903)
 May 21 – Masayoshi Ito, politician (b. 1913)
 November 13 – Motoo Kimura, geneticist (b. 1924)
 December 4 – Ichiro Ogimura, table tennis player (b. 1932)
 December 9 – Kinichiro Sakaguchi, agricultural chemist and microbiologist (b. 1897)

See also
 1994 in Japanese television
 List of Japanese films of 1994

References

 
Years of the 20th century in Japan
Japan